Emily Anne Eliza Shirreff (3 November 1814 – 20 March 1897) was a pioneer in the movement for the higher education of women and the development of the Froebelian principles in England.

Biography

Family
She was born on 3 November 1814, the second of four daughters and two sons born to Rear-Admiral William Henry Shirreff (1785–1847) and Elizabeth Anne Shirreff. She was very close to her sister Maria Shirreff (later Grey), with whom she collaborated with on educational and writing projects.

Education
Emily and her sisters were educated from an early age by a French governess called Adele Piqet, who had a limited education. In the 1820s the family lived in France where the father was stationed. Emily was a bright scholar at an early age but after suffering from a severe illness at the age of seven she had to relearn the alphabet. Emily suffered from ill health for the rest of her life.

At the age of 14 she was sent to a boarding school in Paris but the rough conditions at the school affected Emily's poor health and she was removed a year later. In 1829, her father took command of HMS Warspite and moved his family to Avranche in Lower Normandy. In 1831 her father was appointed to Gibraltar and did not think it his daughters needed another governess, bringing their formal education to an end.

Maria and Emily continued to improve their education through 'self-improvement' by travelling extensively to France, Spain and Italy, reading in their father's extensive library, and became acquainted with many intellectuals of the age through their father's contacts.

Early writings
Emily and Maria first began to write together when Mrs Shirreff brought her daughters back to England in 1834. Their first publication, Letters from Spain and Barbary, was published in 1835. Though Maria was married in 1841, the two sisters continued to write together and anonymously published a romantic novel, Passion and Principle. In 1850, they published Thoughts on Self-Culture Addressed to Women, in which they disapproved of traditional girls' education which only trained women to be dependent on men and not teach them to think for themselves. In 1858, Shirreff published her first major solo work Intellectual Education and its Influence on the Character and Happiness of Women, which further highlighted Emily's belief that women should not be educated as 'man's subordinate'.

Educational work
In the 1870s, the sisters actively turned their attention to promoting education. Emily helped raise funds for the North London Collegiate School and continued to write papers on women's education. She was the second mistress of Girton College, Cambridge succeeding Charlotte Manning who served for only a term. Shirreff remained connected to the college until her death. Emily was one of the founders of the Froebel Society and was its president from 1876 until her death. She also wrote many articles and booklets on kindergarten education. Emily was also the vice-president of the Parents' National Union.

In 1871, with her sister, Mary Gurney, Henrietta Stanley, Baroness Stanley of Alderley, and the support of HRH Princess Louise, Emily founded the National Union for the Improvement of the Education of Women of all Classes, (also known as the Women's Education Union). Emily was heavily involved in the work of the union as its honorary secretary and co-editor of its journal, the Journal of the Women’s Education Union. The Union also found the Girls' Public Day School Company in 1872, which opened secondary schools for girls which offered the same educational opportunities as boys' schools, and still operates today as the Girls' Day School Trust. She was very active on the Council of the company and was made a vice-president in 1896. Emily was also involved in the Union's foundation of an evening college for women and the teachers training and registration society.

Other interests

Emily was also interested in other areas of research and supported women's suffrage. Her opposition of the continuation of the use of slaves in southern US was aired in her 1864 paper, The Chivalry of the South. In 1874 she joined the Women's Peace and Arbitration Auxiliary, (later the London Peace Society). She also wrote a biographical sketch of Henry Thomas Buckle, who had been a close friend, for a posthumous edition of his works in 1872.

Later life
Emily had suffered from ill health all her life and became less active towards the end of her life She died in London on 20 March 1897 and was buried in Brompton cemetery.

Publications
 Shirreff, Maria Georgina; Shirreff, Emily (1841), Passion and Principal. Edited by Captain Schmier. London.
 Grey, Maria Georgina; Shirreff, Emily (1850), Thoughts on Self-Culture Addressed to Women. London
 New editions 1862 and 1863. 

Shirreff, Emily (1870). "College Education for Women," The Contemporary Review.

Published sources

See also
Maria Georgina Grey
Girls' Day School Trust

References

External links

Biography of Emily Shirreff from the Froebel web online resource
Philippa Levine, 'Shirreff, Emily Anne Eliza (1814–1897)’, Oxford Dictionary of National Biography, Oxford University Press, Sept 2004; online edn, Oct 2005 Accessed 27 Nov 2007. index entry.
Girton College past mistresses index

English non-fiction writers
English feminists
1814 births
1897 deaths
Burials at Brompton Cemetery
Mistresses of Girton College, Cambridge
English romantic fiction writers
Women of the Victorian era
English educational theorists
Presidents of the Girls' Day School Trust
19th-century English novelists
19th-century British women writers